The Ministry of Fisheries and Livestock (MOFL, ; Maṯsya ō prāṇisampada mantraṇālaẏa) is a ministry of the government of the People's Republic of Bangladesh whose role is ensuring the sustainable utilisation of fisheries and livestock.

SM Rezaul Karim is the minister of this ministry. Dhirendra D. Shambhu, Mahabubul Alam Hanif and Soto Monir among others are members of the parliamentary standing committee on 11th National Parliament.

Directorates
Department of Livestock
Bangladesh Fisheries Research Institute
Department of Fisheries
Bangladesh Livestock Research Institute (BLRI)
Bangladesh Fisheries Development Corporation
Marine Fisheries Academy

References

 
Fisheries and Livestock
Fisheries ministries
Fishing in Bangladesh
1972 establishments in Bangladesh